Bourque is a surname of Acadian origin. The name may refer to:

Chris Bourque (born 1986), American ice hockey player (son of Ray, brother of Ryan)
Claude Bourque (born 1915), Canadian ice hockey player
Curt Bourque (born 1967), American horse-racing jockey
David Bourque (born 1955), Canadian musician
E. A. Bourque (1887–1962), Canadian politician; Mayor of Ottawa 1949–50
Edna Bourque (1915–2012), Canadian volunteer with the elderly
François Bourque (born 1984), Canadian Olympic skier
Gabriel Bourque (born 1990), Canadian ice hockey player
James Bourque (1935–1996), Canadian First Nations activist
John Samuel Bourque (1894–1974), Canadian politician from Quebec; provincial legislator 1935–60; government minister
Justin Bourque (born 1989), Canadian convicted triple murderer 
Mark Bourque (1948–2005), Canadian RCMP officer; killed while working with the UN in Haiti
Pat Bourque (born 1947), American baseball player
Phil Bourque (born 1962), American ice hockey player
Pierre Bourque (born 1942), Québécois politician; mayor of Montreal 1994–2001
Pierre Bourque (born 1958), Canadian Internet entrepreneur
Ray Bourque (born 1960), Canadian ice hockey player (father of Chris and Ryan)
René Bourque (born 1981), Canadian ice hockey player
Renée Bourque (born 1977), American actress
Romuald Bourque (1889–1974), Canadian politician from Quebec; MP 1952–74
 Ryan Bourque (born 1991), American ice hockey player (son of Ray, brother of Chris)
Thomas-Jean Bourque (1864–1952), Canadian politician from New Brunswick; MP 1917–52
Wayne Bourque (born 1959), Canadian North American Native boxing champion
Also colloquial name for the city Albuquerque, New Mexico 1706 

French-language surnames